Charles "Charlie" James Morris (7 June 1926 – 4 June 2015) was an Australian hammer thrower who competed in the 1956 Summer Olympics as well as the 1958 and the 1962 British Empire and Commonwealth Games.

References

1926 births
2015 deaths
Australian male hammer throwers
Olympic athletes of Australia
Athletes (track and field) at the 1956 Summer Olympics
Commonwealth Games competitors for Australia
Athletes (track and field) at the 1958 British Empire and Commonwealth Games
Athletes (track and field) at the 1962 British Empire and Commonwealth Games